Alamo Landing Field  is a public-use airport located  west of the central business district of Alamo, in Lincoln County, Nevada, United States. The airport is owned by the U.S. Bureau of Land Management. It is the closest public-use airport to Groom Lake.

History 
This airport was abandoned prior to 1959 and resumed service around 1994. It was also known as Pahranagat Airport.

Facilities and aircraft 
For the 12-month period ending July 31, 2015, the airport had 1100 aircraft operations, an average of 19 per month: 18% military and 82% general aviation.

References

External links 
   from Nevada DOT
 Aerial photo as of September 1999 from USGS The National Map
 

Airports in Nevada
Transportation in Lincoln County, Nevada
Buildings and structures in Lincoln County, Nevada
Bureau of Land Management